Also Bassi (January 29, 1962 – May 10, 2020) was an Italian jazz trumpeter.

References

1962 births
2020 deaths
Italian jazz trumpeters
Musicians from Rome